Carlsfjella is a mountain ridge in Oscar II Land at Spitsbergen, Svalbard. The ridge has a length of 14 kilometers, is located between St. Jonsfjorden and Løvenskioldfonna, and includes Valentinryggen, Patronen, Knausen and Haraldfjellet.  The ridge is named after land owner Carl Otto Løvenskiold.

References

Mountains of Spitsbergen